The 1900 U.S. Open was the sixth U.S. Open, held October 4–5 at Chicago Golf Club in Wheaton, Illinois, a suburb west of  On a tour of the United States from Britain, Harry Vardon won his only U.S. Open title, two strokes ahead of his great rival, 

In the U.S. to promote the Vardon Flyer Ball, Vardon made his first appearance at the U.S. Open. Taylor was also in America on business and decided to enter, creating a highly anticipated matchup between the two great British rivals. Together they formed two-thirds of the Great Triumvirate that dominated British golf at the turn of the century (the third, James Braid, never played in the U.S. Open).

On Thursday morning, Taylor opened with 76 for a two-shot lead, but an 82 in the afternoon put him one back of Vardon after 36 holes. On Friday morning, Vardon's 76 opened up a four-stroke lead over Taylor, who was seven clear of the field. Despite an 80 in the afternoon for 313, Vardon prevailed by two, as Taylor shot 78 for 315. Local Chicago pro David Bell was a distant third at 322.

Neither Vardon nor Taylor won another major outside The Open Championship, which they won a combined eleven times. Vardon did not play in the U.S. Open again until 1913, when he and Ted Ray lost a playoff to amateur Francis Ouimet. He was also runner-up in his third and final Open appearance, in 1920. Taylor played the U.S. Open only once more, also in 1913, and was thirtieth.

Course

Past champions in the field 

Source:

Did not play: Joe Lloyd (1897)

Round summaries

First round
Thursday, October 4, 1900 (morning)

Source:

Second round
Thursday, October 4, 1900 (afternoon)

Source:

Third round
Friday, October 5, 1900 (morning)

Source:

Final round
Friday, October 5, 1900 (afternoon)

Source:

Amateurs: Macdonald (355), Johnstone (356), Holabird (361), Stuart (362), Egan (379).

Winner's scorecards

Source:

References

External links
USGA Championship Database

U.S. Open (golf)
Golf in Illinois
Wheaton, Illinois
U.S. Open
U.S. Open (golf)
U.S. Open
October 1900 sports events